Russell Dean Bolinger (born September 10, 1954) is a former American football offensive lineman, actor, broadcaster, playwright, sports writer/Detroit Free Press and an NFL Football Scout. He played for nine seasons in the National Football League (NFL) from 1976 to 1985 and in 1985 he played for the Memphis Showboats of the USFL. For the past 30 years he has worked as a recruiting coordinator for the University of Utah, an NFL scout for the Jacksonville Jaguars, Detroit Lions, Washington Redskins, St. Louis Rams, and Atlanta Falcons.

External links
NFL.com player page
 http://articles.latimes.com/1989-03-17/entertainment/ca-1524_1_richard-iii/2
 http://www.atlantafalcons.com/team/staff/Russ-Bolinger/3e32db48-8e49-4a2e-8630-3f7e5f1b8ec0

1954 births
Living people
Players of American football from Wichita, Kansas
American football offensive tackles
American football offensive guards
California State University, Long Beach alumni
Long Beach State 49ers football players
UC Riverside Highlanders football players
Detroit Lions players
Los Angeles Rams players